UCU Canons is an Ugandan basketball club based in Kampala. The team is officially part of the Uganda Christian University (UCU).

Honours
National Basketball League
Runners-up: 2019–20

Notable players
Jonathan Egau
Ivan Lumanyika

References

Basketball teams in Uganda